Qüxü County, or Qushui or Chushur or Chushul, is a county in the Lhasa southwest of the main center of Chengguan, Tibet, China.
It is mountainous in the northwest, flatter near the Lhasa River, which runs through the east of the county, and the Yarlung Tsangpo, which forms the southern border.
The population as of 2000 was 29,690, mostly engaged in agriculture or animal husbandry. The county is home to the Nyethang Drolma Lhakhang Temple.

Geography

In the Tibetan language the name means "water ditch."
The county is in the Yarlung Tsangpo valley, and is mostly relatively flat, but rises to the Nyainqêntanglha Mountains in the north.
The Lhasa River runs south through the eastern part of the county to its confluence with the Yarlung Tsangpo River, which forms the southern boundary of the county.
The lowest elevation is 3,500 meters, and the highest summit elevation is 5894 meters.

Qüxü County has a temperate semi-arid plateau monsoon climate zone with 3,000 hours of annual sunshine hours on average and 150 days a year without frost.
Natural disasters such as flash floods, landslides, drought, sandstorms, pests and diseases are common.
Mineral resources include mainly corundum, limestone, granite, peat and so on. 
Wild animals include Himalayan blue sheep, pheasants, deer, leopard and brown bear.
Medicinal plants include Chinese caterpillar fungus, Fritillaria and Codonopsis.

Administrative divisions

Qüxü County was established in August 1959.
The county includes one town, five townships, and seventeen administrative villages.
The town and townships are:

 Qüxü Town
 Nyêtang Township
 Carbanang Township
 Caina Township
 Nam Township
 Dagar Township.

Demographics

The fifth census in 2000 recorded a population of 29,690 as follows: Qüxü Town 7,406, Nyêtang Township 4,103, Carbanang Township 3,831, Caina Township 4,400, Nam Township 2,909 and Dagar Township 7,041. The total labor force was 15,640 of whom 7,948 were male and 7,692 female.
The county seat has been growing fast, and had 5,000 people by 2002.
The Fourth Jamgon Kongtrul was born in the county in 1995.

Infrastructure

As of 2002 there was one County Middle School, and 18 primary schools.
98% of the population received radio coverage and 94% received television.
There are fourteen small hydropower stations in Qüxü County with a total installed capacity of 1780 kilowatts, creating an annual four million kW·h of electricity.
China National Highway 318 runs through the county from Lhasa towards the west.
Bridges span the Lhasa River and the Yarlung Tsangpo River.
The county is also home to a prison.

Economy

Qüxü County is semi-agricultural and crops grown are mainly highland barley, winter wheat, spring wheat, peas and rapeseed. 
Apples and walnuts are also produced.
Animal husbandry is also strong, with the main animals farmed including yak, cattle, goats, sheep, horses, donkeys, pigs, and chickens.
As of 2002 the per capita net income of farmers and herdsmen was 1,960 yuan.
The county has been rapidly developing organic farming of snow peach, tobacco, tulips, chrysanthemum and saffron.
Farm products have been sold in other parts of China under the "Lhasa Pure" brand. 
They include barley, barley wine, barley tea, yak milk, Tibetan Chicken, Rhodiola, Cordyceps, Maca and glacier water.

In Junba village (俊巴渔村) about 70% of the households manufacture small leather items in traditional styles for sale to domestic and foreign tourists.
Other women in the county are engaged in hand-weaving, preserving traditional styles, although as of 2015 working conditions were poor.
Construction of a  industrial park in Qüxü for small and medium enterprises began in September 2014, with completion expected in June 2015.
Other enterprises include a factory for farm tools, and a grain and oil processing plant.

The Nyethang Drolma Lhakhang Temple is located in Qüxü County. The temple is said to have been founded in 1055 by Dromtön, a pupil of Atiśa.
It is small, but has a unique architecture and many interesting statues. There are relics dating back to the Ming dynasty (1368–1644).
It is operated by monks of the Gelug sect.

References

Sources